The Association of Muslim Schools (SA) is a national network of Muslim Schools in South Africa.

The association consists of 68 schools nationally. AMS-SA encompasses both primary and high schools as well as independent and state-aided schools. It is active in 3 of 9 South African provinces.

History
AMS-SA was formed in March 1989 at Al Falaah College, known as Lockhat Islamia College at the time. The primary members of the association were:Habibiya Islamic College, Lockhat Islamia College, Roshnee Islamic School, As-Salaam, Lenasia Muslim School and Nur-ul-Islam School.
The association was formally launched on 13 May 1989 during the first AMS conference at Lenasia Muslim School.
AMS was mandated to facilitate the following:
Administrative collaboration
Educator development workshops
Evaluation/moderation of final examination papers
Inter-school sports
Subject-based workshops
A community outreach programme
AMS-SA has grown steadily over the years. The annual general meeting and teachers' conference has attracted many prominent personalities from the educational field over the years. The association further has a managers' conference and a principals' forum that engage at a regular basis.
Currently the association consists of 68 schools nationally. It is further recognized by and regularly engages with the national and provincial educational departments, South African Council for Teachers (SACE), Umalusi (National accreditation body for independent schools), Sector Education and Training Authority (SETA).

Chapters
AMS-SA comprises three chapters which meet annually at the National AMS AGM and Education Conference.  Each chapter has the following member schools:

KwaZulu-Natal

Al Falaah College
As-Salaam Education Institute
Al-Azhar School of Durban
Anjuman School
Crescent Girls High
Hartley Road Primary
Ihsaan Boys College
Ihsaan Girl's College
Islamic College Newcastle
Islamic Education Centre
Islamia Muslim School 	
Juma Masjid Primary
Maritzburg Muslim School
Masakhane School
Mohammed Ebrahim Islamic School

Newcastle Islamic 	
Nizamia Islamic School
Orient Islamic School
Phoenix Muslim School
Pietermaritzburg Islamia
Port Shepstone Islamic School
Siratul Haq
South Coast Madressa Primary
Tongaat Islamic School
Umzinto Islamic School
Verulam Islamic School
Zakariyya Muslim School

Gauteng

Al-Nur Muslim School
Welkom Muslim School 	  	
Al- Aqsa School
Al Asr School
Al Azar School
Al Ghazali School
Azaadville Muslim School	
Benoni Muslim School
Bosmont Muslim School
Central Islamic School
Eldorado Park Muslim School
Johannesburg Muslim School
Lenasia Muslim School

Markaz- Ad Dawah Al-Islamia 	
Nur-ul-Islam School 	
PMT Sunni School
Roshnee Islamic School
Sama School
Springs Muslim School
Tshwane Muslim School
Highveld Muslim School
Middleburg Muslim School
Northern Muslim School
Al-Huda Muslim School
Nurul Iman Muslim School

Western Cape

Nasruddin Islamic School
Al Azhar Primary School
Ambassador's College
Belhar Education College  	  	
Darul Islam School
Hidayatul Islam Primary School 	  	  	
Ieglasie Niyah Primary School  	
Islamia College

Islamic College
Junior College
Madrassatur Raja
Madrassatur Tarbiyah
Mitchells Plain School
Nurul Huda School	  	  	
Sama School

Affiliations
The Association of Muslim Schools is a founding member of the National Alliance of Independent Schools of South Africa (NAISA). This is an umbrella body representing independent schools associations and "Joint Liaison Committees". AMS-SA is the South African Chapter of the Association of Muslim Schools.

Competitions
The Association of Muslim Schools holds annual inter-school tournaments and competitions.

References

External links
AMS-SA official site

Islamic schools in South Africa
Islamic education in South Africa